Christoph Eschenbach is a German pianist and conductor.

Early life
Eschenbach was born in Breslau, Germany (now Wrocław, Poland) as Christopher Ringmann. His parents were Margarethe (née Jaross), a singer and teacher of piano and Heribert Ringmann, professor of music at Brelsau. He was orphaned during World War II. His mother died giving birth to him; his father, a politically active anti-Nazi, was sent to the Eastern front as part of a Nazi punishment battalion where he was killed. His grandmother cared for him, but she died in the winter of 1945/46 at a refugee camp in Mecklenburg. As a result of this trauma, Eschenbach did not speak for a year, until he was asked if he wanted to play music. Wallydore Eschenbach (née Jaross), his mother's cousin, adopted him in 1946 and began to teach him to play the piano from 1948 through 1959. He lived with Wallydore and her husband Wolfram Eschenbach in Wismar, then in Neustadt in Holstein. At age 11, he attended a concert conducted by Wilhelm Furtwängler which had a great impact on him. In 1955, Eschenbach enrolled at the Musikhochschule in Cologne, studying piano with Hans-Otto Schmidt-Neuhaus and conducting with Wilhelm Brückner-Rüggeberg. He also completed his Abitur at the Einhard-Gymnasium in Aachen in 1959. He then pursued studies at the Hochschule für Musik und Theater Hamburg with Eliza Hansen (piano) and Wilhelm Brückner-Rüggeberg (conducting).

Musical career
As a pianist, Eschenbach has won numerous first-place piano competition prizes, including first prize in the Clara Haskil Competition in Vevey, Switzerland in 1965. In 1964, he made his first recording (of Mozart) for Deutsche Grammophon and signed a contract with the label. Eschenbach continued to study conducting with George Szell, with whom he worked for more than three years. In addition, he counted Herbert von Karajan as a mentor.

In 1981, Eschenbach became principal guest conductor of the Tonhalle Orchestra Zurich, and was chief conductor from 1982 to 1986.  He was co-artistic director of the Pacific Music Festival from 1992 to 1998.  He was chief conductor of the NDR Symphony Orchestra, Hamburg from 1998 to 2004.  He was artistic director of the Schleswig-Holstein Musik Festival from 1999 until 2003, and became principal conductor of the Schleswig-Holstein Festival Orchestra in 2003. From 2000 to 2010, Eschenbach was Music Director of the Orchestre de Paris.

In the United States, Eschenbach was music director of the Houston Symphony Orchestra from 1988 to 1999.  The orchestra toured Japan and Europe under his tenure as well made several recordings with Koch International Classics and RCA.  In honour of his achievements and tenure with the Houston Symphony, the City of Houston placed a bronze commemorative star with his name in front of Jones Hall, the performance home of the Houston Symphony. He was music director of the Ravinia Festival from 1994 to 2005.

Eschenbach has made more than 80 recordings as piano soloist, conductor, or both, has appeared in several television documentaries, and has made many concert broadcasts for different European, Japanese and U.S. networks.  Eschenbach is credited with helping and supporting talented young musicians in their career development, including soprano Renée Fleming, pianists Tzimon Barto and Lang Lang, cellists , and Daniel Müller-Schott, and soprano Marisol Montalvo.

Philadelphia Orchestra
Eschenbach became the seventh music director of The Philadelphia Orchestra in 2003.  His appointment generated controversy because, at the time of the announcement, Eschenbach had not conducted the orchestra in over four years and there was a perceived lack of personal chemistry between him and the musicians prior to the appointment.  One musician from the orchestra had stated, after the announcement:

 "'When this announcement was proclaimed after a half-hour meeting with us, there wasn't applause; there was criticism,' recalled a musician with the Philadelphia Orchestra. 'One member of the search committee got up and said, "You'll see, you'll like him."

'The orchestra was taken aback by the attitude because there was no meeting to verify what we thought,' the musician said. 'There was no chemistry with Eschenbach. He hasn't conducted us in four or five years and 20 to 30 persons had never played with him.'"

In a 2004 article, Eschenbach tried to downplay such statements, and noted his own particular style of interpretation:

 "I prefer to have flexible tempos and not be fixed. Quicker tempos tend to court superficiality."

Partway into his tenure, his initial 3-year contract was renewed to 2008.

However, in October 2006, the orchestra and Eschenbach announced that he would conclude his tenure in Philadelphia at the close of the 2007–2008 season. In the weeks prior to his departure, Philadelphia Inquirer music critics Peter Dobrin and David Patrick Stearns produced contrasting articles whether or not he should be retained, with Dobrin suggesting that Eschenbach should move on and Stearns arguing that Eschenbach should remain. Other harsh criticism of Eschenbach's tenure in Philadelphia has been aired.

Following the announcement, Dobrin in the Inquirer wrote that Eschenbach's tenure in Philadelphia has been difficult for many musicians:

 "In three seasons, Eschenbach and the orchestra have produced a handful of brilliant concerts. More often, though, his rehearsals and performances have elicited a long list of complaints from musicians: getting lost in the score at concerts; leading disorganized rehearsals and then asking for overtime; and insisting on a peculiar rushing and slowing of tempos."

The paper also cited a number of accomplishments including a new recording contract and the appointment of nine musicians, four of whom were principals. In addition, Eschenbach has received praise for his work in fund-raising for the orchestra.

Following the announcement and Dobrin's Inquirer article, The Philadelphia Orchestra Association posted a letter on its website, dated 27 October 2006, which also was sent by e-mail to orchestra patrons. A quote from this letter condemned Dobrin's criticism:

 "We, and many in the community, feel that in recent press coverage there have been personal attacks on Maestro Eschenbach, along with negative innuendo about his relationship with The Philadelphia Orchestra. ...These types of comments about Maestro Eschenbach and our orchestra are ridiculous, offensive and defamatory. Our entire orchestra family is profoundly disappointed when reporters report the news in such an ungracious way."

Dobrin, in turn, responded in a 29 October 2006 Philadelphia Inquirer article by quoting one of his 2001 Inquirer articles around the time of the Eschenbach announcement:

 "....let me quote from something I wrote in March 2001 that might be an important reminder about how we got to this dangerous place:

 It hit many musicians like the dull thud of pragmatism, this decision in January to hire Eschenbach as the orchestra's seventh music director, starting in September 2003. At a meeting announcing the decision, players responded with silence. No applause, no excited stamping of feet. Silence. And then the resentment poured forth.

 One musician used the word "underwhelmed." Another said he felt "betrayed."...

This contrasts with earlier reports of how the musicians "had input" in the choice of the previous Philadelphia music director, Wolfgang Sawallisch.  In addition, the new orchestra president (as of 2006), James Undercofler, had spoken with orchestra musicians, and had told Eschenbach this summary of his discussions with them:

 "-that 80 percent of the musicians did not agree with his artistic interpretations;
 -that 80 percent of the musicians left concerts feeling great anger;
 -and that the orchestra was a "ticking time bomb."

In an article by Cragg Hines in the newspaper The Washingtonian on 1 December 2009 Eschenbach was quoted:

 "They said there was a survey of the whole orchestra and more than 80 percent of the orchestra was against me. I asked the management 'was that true?' and was told, ‘Yes, it's true.' It was not true at all. As I found out a little later, this survey never happened [...] All of the musicians regretted very, very much that [it] was reported like this."

In a 2007 article, Mark Swed of the Los Angeles Times has written about the Eschenbach/Philadelphia Orchestra situation:

 "{Eschenbach} is one of the world's finest musicians and widely recognized as such. He has ideas. He has sophisticated tastes. He is cosmopolitan. He is an exciting interpreter. Colleagues speak of him warmly, and he is a favorite accompanist for singers.....So what's wrong? Just about everything. It is well known that the orchestra opposed the hiring of Eschenbach. He hadn't conducted in Philadelphia for five years when the appointment was made, and a memo was leaked to the press with 75 players' signatures asking management to hold off any decision until the orchestra got a chance to work with him. From the beginning, the relationship started off on the wrong foot...But the Philadelphia orchestra has not been exactly transformed by Eschenbach. I've been hearing reports of players looking bored onstage. Audiences walk out during performances. Even two years ago, at my last visit to Verizon Hall, the atmosphere was palpably unpleasant."

In a June 2007 article, Stearns reported Eschenbach as commenting on the Philadelphia Orchestra management as follows:

 "The management in both cases [Paris and Philadelphia], I'm sorry to say, is amateurish"...."The management knows what I think ... it's not a secret".

In a July 2007 article, Dobrin emphasized that the problems in the Eschenbach/Philadelphia Orchestra relationship were not related to personality, but rather to musical quality:

 "While many refuse to believe it, the factor that has undermined Christoph Eschenbach's tenure is not personality. He's a lovely guy; he and the players have a cordial off-stage relationship. The problem is the music. If 80 percent of the musicians leave concerts angry – as Eschenbach told players that president James Undercofler had told him – that's corrosive to the music and the institution."

In August 2007, the orchestra announced extended guest-conducting periods for Eschenbach with the ensemble in the 2008–2009 and 2009–2010 seasons, after the conclusion of his tenure as music director.

Later career
In September 2008, the National Symphony Orchestra (NSO) appointed Eschenbach as its sixth music director, effective with the 2010–2011 season, as well as the newly created music director of the Kennedy Center.  In September 2011, the NSO and the Kennedy Center announced the extension of Eschenbach's contract through the 2014–2015 season.  In March 2014, the organisations announced an extension of Eschenbach's contract through the 2016–2017 season.  In February 2015, the NSO announced that Eschenbach was to conclude his tenure as NSO music director at the end of the 2016–2017 season.  Eschenbach subsequently took the title of conductor laureate of the NSO.

In November 2017, the Konzerthausorchester Berlin announced the appointment of Eschenbach as its next chief conductor, effective with the 2019–2020 season, with an initial contract of 3 years.  In July 2021, the Konzerthausorchester Berlin announced the extension of Eschenbach's contract through the 2022–2023 season.  He is scheduled to stand down from the Konzerthausorchester Berlin post at the close of the 2022-2023 season.

Honours and awards
 1993: Pacific Music Festival, Leonard Bernstein Award
 1993: Commander's Cross
 August 2002: Grand Cross of the Order of Merit of the Federal Republic of Germany
 October 2002: Legion d'honneur of France
 June 2006: Chevalier (knight) of the French Ordre des Arts et des Lettres
 2010: Order of Merit of Schleswig-Holstein
 2015: Ernst von Siemens Music Prize

References

Further reading
 Hines, Cragg. "Making Musicians Play Like Devils & Angels", Washingtonian, 1 December 2009.

External links
 Christoph Eschenbach official website
 Bruce Duffie, Interview with Christoph Eschenbach, 10 August 1990

German classical pianists
Male classical pianists
German male conductors (music)
20th-century German conductors (music)
20th-century German male musicians
21st-century German conductors (music)
21st-century German male musicians
Living people
Musicians from Wrocław
Texas classical music
Knights Commander of the Order of Merit of the Federal Republic of Germany
Chevaliers of the Ordre des Arts et des Lettres
Chevaliers of the Légion d'honneur
Grammy Award winners
Hochschule für Musik und Theater Hamburg alumni
Hochschule für Musik und Tanz Köln alumni
Ernst von Siemens Music Prize winners
Music directors of the Philadelphia Orchestra
Deutsche Grammophon artists
National Symphony Orchestra
Year of birth missing (living people)